Chaac (also spelled Chac or, in Classic Mayan, Chaahk ) is the name of the Maya god of rain, thunder, and lighting. With his lightning axe, Chaac strikes the clouds, causing them to produce thunder and rain. Chaac corresponds to Tlaloc among the Aztecs.

Rain deities and rain makers 

Like other Mayan gods, Chaac is both one and manifold. Four Chaacs are based in the cardinal directions and wear the directional colors. In 16th-century Yucatán, the directional Chaac of the east was called Chac Xib Chaac 'Red Man Chaac', only the colors being varied for the three other ones.

Contemporary Yucatec Maya farmers distinguish many more aspects of the rainfall and the clouds and personify them as different, hierarchically-ordered rain deities. The Chorti Maya have preserved important folklore regarding the process of rain-making, which involved rain deities striking rain-carrying snakes with their axes.

The rain deities had their human counterparts. In the traditional Mayan (and Mesoamerican) community, one of the most important functions was that of rainmaker, which presupposed an intimate acquaintance with (and thus, initiation by) the rain deities, and a knowledge of their places and movements. According to a Late-Postclassic Yucatec tradition, Chac Xib Chaac (the rain deity of the east) was the title of a king of Chichen Itza, and similar titles were bestowed upon Classic rulers as well (see below).

Rain rituals 
Among the rituals for the rain deities, the Yucatec Chʼa Cháak ceremony for asking rain centers on a ceremonial banquet for the rain deities. It includes four boys (one for each cardinal point) acting and chanting as frogs. Asking for rain and crops was also the purpose of 16th-century rituals at the cenotes, of Yucatán. Young men and women were lowered into these wells, so as to make them enter the realm of the rain deities. Alternatively, they were thrown into the wells later to be drawn up again, and give oracles.

Mythology 

The rain deity is a patron of agriculture. A well-known myth in which the Chaacs (or related Rain and Lightning deities) have an important role to play is about the opening of the mountain in which the maize was hidden. In Tzotzil mythology, the rain deity also figures as the father of nubile women representing maize and vegetables. In some versions of the Qʼeqchiʼ myth of Sun and Moon, the rain deity Choc (or Chocl) 'Cloud' is the brother of Sun; together they defeat their aged adoptive mother and her lover. Later, Chaac commits adultery with his brother's wife and is duly punished; his tears of agony give origin to the rain. Versions of this myth show the rain deity Chac in his war-like fury, pursuing the fleeing Sun and Moon, and attacking them with his lightning bolts.

Iconography 

Chaac is usually depicted with a human body showing reptilian or amphibian scales, and with a non-human head evincing fangs and a long, pendulous nose. In the Classic style, a shell serves as his ear ornament. He often carries a shield and a lightning axe, the axe being personified by a closely related deity, God K, called Bolon Dzacab in Yucatec. The Classic Chaac sometimes shows features of the Central Mexican (Teotihuacan) precursor of Tlaloc.

Rain 
A large part of one of the four surviving Maya codices, the Dresden Codex, is dedicated to the Chaacs, their locations, and activities. It illustrates the intimate relationship existing between the Chaacs, the Bacabs, and the aged goddess, Ixchel. The main source on the 16th-century Yucatec Maya, Bishop Diego de Landa, combines the four Chaacs with the four Bacabs and Pauahtuns into one concept. The Bacabs were aged deities governing the subterranean sphere and its water supplies.

Warfare 
In the Classic period, the king often impersonated the rain deity (or an associated rain serpent) while a portrait glyph of the rain deity can accompany the king's other names. This may have given expression to his role as a supreme rain-maker. Typically, however, it is the war-like fury of the rain deity that receives emphasis (as is also the case in the myth mentioned above). The king personifying the rain deity is then shown carrying war implements and making prisoners, while his actions seem to be equated with the violence of a thunderstorm.

Classic period narrative 
About Chaahk's role in Classic period mythological narrative, little is known. He is present at the resurrection of the Maya maize god from the carapace of a turtle, possibly representing the earth. The so-called 'confrontation scenes' are of a more legendary nature. They show a young nobleman and his retinue wading through the waters and being approached by warriors. One of these warriors is a man personifying the rain deity. He probably represents an ancestral king, and seems to be referred to as Chak Xib [Chaahk]. Together with the skeletal Death God (God A), Chaahk also appears to preside over an initiate's ritual transformation into a jaguar.

In popular culture 
 Chaac is featured in Marvel Comics as part of the Ahau (a pantheon of gods worshipped by the Maya people).  In Black Panther: Wakanda Forever, he is revered as a god by Namor and the inhabitants of Talokan.
 Chaac is a playable warrior in SMITE.

See also 
 Klein, Rolando (Director), Chac: Dios de la lluvia (1975), a film made with Mayan actors.
 Yopaat, a closely related southern Maya storm god
 Aktzin

References

Citations

Sources 

 Braakhuis, Edwin, and Kerry Hull, Pluvial Aspects of the Mesoamerican Culture Hero. Anthropos 2014/2: 449–466.
 Cruz Torres, Mario, Rubelpec.
 García Barrios, Ana, El aspecto bélico de Chaahk, el dios de la lluvia, en el Periodo Clásico maya. Revista Española de Antropología Americana 39-1 (2009): 7-29.
 Redfield, Robert, and Alfonso Barrera Vasquez,  Chan Kom.
 Roys, Ralph L., The Book of Chilam Balam of Chumayel. 1967.
 Taube, Karl, An Illustrated Dictionary of the Gods and Symbols of Ancient Mexico and the Maya.
 Thompson, J.E.S., Maya History and Religion. 1970.
 Tozzer, Alfred, Landa's Relación de las Cosas de Yucatán, a Translation. 1941.
 Wisdom, Charles, The Chorti Mayas.

Maya deities
Sky and weather gods
Thunder gods
Rain deities
Harvest deities
Mesoamerican deities